The Economic and Social Commission for Asia and the Pacific (UNESCAP or ESCAP), East and North-East Asia Office was inaugurated on 17 May 2010 in Incheon, South Korea. Since its establishment, the Office has been working closely with six member States and two associate members to build and strengthen partnerships and cooperation for inclusive and sustainable development in the subregion.

It also serves as the Secretariat of the North-East Asian Subregional Programme for Environmental Cooperation (NEASPEC) which was launched in 1993 by the same six member States as a subregional follow-up of the United Nations Conference on Environment and Development (UNCED, Rio Conference or Earth Summit) in 1992.

Background
Three new ESCAP Subregional Offices were established during 2010-2011 for East and North-East Asia, North and Central Asia, and South and South-West Asia by the UN General Assembly resolution on development-related activities (63/260). The resolution was adopted pursuant to the UN Secretary-General's report (A/62/708) on improving the effective and efficient delivery of the mandates of development-related activities. The report highlighted the need for strengthening programme implementation at the subregional levels, facilitating subregional linkages and policy dialogue, and promoting specific subregional priorities.

Key areas of work
Under the overall mandate to support regional economic cooperation and integration and the achievement of the Sustainable Development Goals (SDGs), the Office carries out the following work:

1. Addressing Social Challenges through Science, Technology and Innovation 
Knowledge-Sharing Platform for Sustainable Ageing Societies 
Youth Innovation for SDGs 
 SDGs Monitoring and Implementation using Big Data

2. Strengthening Intraregional Connectivity 
Trade and Transport, in particular, with Mongolia 
International Road Transport Agreement between China, Mongolia, and the Russian Federation
Policy Consultation and Knowledge Sharing on Cross-Border Trade Facilitation

3. Facilitating Development Cooperation 
North-East Asia Development Cooperation Forum 
Green Technology Facilitation

4. Promoting Disaster Resilient Societies 
Capacity Building for Drought Monitoring and Early Warning in Mongolia 
Disaster-related Statistics and Data

5. Improving Environmental Sustainability through NEASPEC* 
Air Pollution*
Desertification and Land Degradation*
Biodiversity and Nature Conservation*
North-East Asian Marine Protected Areas Network (NEAMPAN)*
North-East Asia Low Carbon City Platform (NEA-LCCP)*

Member states

Associate members

Location
Located in G-Tower, Incheon, South Korea.

See also
United Nations Economic and Social Commission for Asia and the Pacific

References 

2010 establishments in South Korea
Organizations based in Incheon
United Nations commissions
Politics of Asia